National and international associations and societies for human genetics host regular meetings to advance human genetics in science, health, and society through excellence in research, education, and advocacy.

References 

Human genetics
Genetics organizations
Conferences
Genetics